João Márcio Arraes da Silva known as Márcio Tarrafa (born 13 April 1985) is a footballer.

Márcio Tarrafa previously played for Boavista FC in the Portuguese Primeira Liga. He also played for Sousa Esporte Clube in the Copa do Brasil.

External links

Profile at Globo Esporte's Futpedia

1985 births
Living people
Brazilian footballers
Boavista F.C. players
Association football midfielders